Azapropazone  is a nonsteroidal anti-inflammatory drug (NSAID). It is manufactured by Goldshield under the tradename Rheumox. 

It was available in the UK as a prescription-only drug, with restrictions due to certain contra-indications and side-effects. Azopropazone has now been discontinued in the British National Formulary.

Azapropazone has a half-life of approximately 20 hours in humans and is not extensively metabolized.

References 

Triazines
Nonsteroidal anti-inflammatory drugs
Lactams